The 2017 season was PKNS's 4th season in the top flight of Malaysian football, the Liga Super after being promoted from 2016 Liga Premier.

Foreign players

Results and fixtures

Overview

{| class="wikitable" style="text-align: center"
|-
!rowspan=2|Competition
!colspan=8|Record
|-
!
!
!
!
!
!
!
!
|-
| Liga Super

|-
| Piala FA

|-
| Piala Malaysia

|-
! Total

Liga Super 

Source: Fixtures / Result

League table

Piala FA

Piala Malaysia

Group stage

Statistics

Squad appearances
Correct as of match played on 28 October 2017

* U19 = Under-19 player
* U21 = Under-21 player

Top scorers
Correct as of match played on 28 October 2017
The list is sorted by shirt number when total goals are equal.

* Player names in bold denotes player that left mid-season

Clean sheets
Correct as of match played on 28 October 2017
The list is sorted by shirt number when total clean sheets are equal.

Transfers
First transfer window started in December 2017 to 22 January 2017 and second transfer window will started on 15 May 2017 to 11 June 2017.

In

First window

Second window

Out

First window

Second window

Loan out

First window

Second window

References

 
Malaysian football clubs 2017 season